Choristodon is a genus of bivalves belonging to the family Veneridae.

The species of this genus are found in Southern Africa and America.

Species:

Choristodon cancellatus 
Choristodon robustus

References

Veneridae
Bivalve genera